Pind Dadan Khan Tehsil (Urdu/Punjabi:  تحصیل پنڈ دادن خان) is a subdivision of Jhelum District, Punjab, Pakistan. It is headquartered at the town of Pind Dadan Khan located on the bank of River Jhelum, about 22 kilometres from the M2 motorway.

The area is well known for Khewra Salt Mines, Asia's largest salt mine, in use for over 2000 years, and which features an underground mosque. The area has a long history from the time of Alexander the Great's invasion (see Punjab (Pakistan)). The small town of Jalalpur Sharif is located in Pind Dadan Khan and is said to be where Alexander the Great's famous horse, Bucephalus is buried.

This pind (from Punjabi word for village), is named after Dadan Khan a devoted Sufi saint from Awan tribe.

Union Councils 
Pind Dadan Khan Tehsil is subdivided into 15 Union Councils:
 Ahmedabad
 Chak Shadi
 Daulatpur
 Dharyala Jalap
 Gharibwal
 Golepur
 Gujjar
 Haranpur
 Pinanwal
 Jalalpur Sharif
 Kandwal
 Khewra
 Lilla
 Pindi SaidPur
 Pind Dadan Khan
 Sauwal
 Tobah

History
The Imperial Gazetteer of India, compiled over a century ago during British rule, describes the tehsil as follows:

See also Tribes 

 Punjabi people

References

External links 

Tehsil's and Union Councils of District Jehlum

Pind Dadan Khan Tehsil
Tehsils of Jhelum District
Jhelum District
Tehsils of Punjab, Pakistan